David Leinar (born 12 November 1979) is a Swedish former footballer who played as a defender.

References

External links
 
 Eliteprospects profile

1979 births
Living people
Swedish footballers
Örgryte IS players
Ljungskile SK players
Motala AIF players
Association football defenders